This is a list of official trips made by Ilir Meta as the 7th President of the Republic of Albania.

2017 
The following international trips were made by President Ilir Meta in 2017:

2018 
The following international trips were made by President Ilir Meta in 2018:

2019 
The following international trips were made by President Ilir Meta in 2019:

See also 
 Ilir Meta
 President of Albania
 Politics of Albania

References 

State visits by Albanian leaders
Meta
Foreign relations of Albania
Diplomatic visits by heads of state